Tina Bøttzau (born in Kolding )  is a former Danish team handball player, two times Olympic champion and a World champion. She received gold medals with the Danish national team at the 1996 Summer Olympics in Atlanta and at the 2000 Summer Olympics in Sydney, and at the 1997 World championship.

References

1971 births
Living people
Danish female handball players
Olympic gold medalists for Denmark
Handball players at the 1996 Summer Olympics
Handball players at the 2000 Summer Olympics
Olympic medalists in handball
Medalists at the 2000 Summer Olympics
Medalists at the 1996 Summer Olympics
People from Kolding
Sportspeople from the Region of Southern Denmark